The Speedway Grand Prix of Germany is a speedway event that is a part of the Speedway Grand Prix Series. Since 2016 the event has been staged at the Bergring Arena in Teterow.

Winners

* Due to inclement weather, the FIM deemed that track at the Veltins-Arena in Gelsenkirchen to be unsafe and the German GP was re-staged a week later in Bydgoszcz, Poland.

Most wins
 Hans Nielsen &  Tomasz Gollob - 2 times

References

See also

 
Grand Prix
Germany